, also known as RKC (Radio Kochi Company), is a Japanese radio and television broadcaster. It was founded in 1953 and headquartered in Kōchi, Japan. Kōchi Broadcasting is affiliated with the NNN and NNS (TV), JRN, NRN (Radio).  It is a part of Kochi Shimbun group. 

Kochi Broadcasting started radio broadcasting in 1953,  and started television broadcasting in 1959. 

In 2022, Kochi Broadcasting moved into its new headquarter.

References 

Nippon News Network
Television stations in Japan
Companies based in Kōchi Prefecture
Television channels and stations established in 1953